Irene Fornaciari (born 24 December 1983) is an Italian singer-songwriter.

She participated in the Sanremo Festival in 2009 in the category "New Proposals" but became famous in the 2010 participating, along with Nomadi, in the category "Artists" with the song  Il mondo piange. She has released two albums, seven singles and a collection.

She is the daughter of Italian singer Zucchero.

Discography

Album 
 2007 – Vertigini in fiore (en: Dizziness in bloom)
 2009 – Vintage Baby (en:Vintage Baby)
 2012 – Grande mistero (en:great mystery)

Collections 
 2010 – Irene Fornaciari

Singles and music videos 

 2006 – Mastichi aria
 2006 – Io non-abito più qua
 2007 – Un sole dentro (with video clips directed by Gaetano Morbioli)
 2007 – Un giro in giro
 2009 – Spiove il sole (with video clips directed by Gaetano Morbioli)
 2010 – Il mondo piange (in collaboration with the Nomadi)
 2010 – Messin' with My Head (in collaboration with the Mousse T.) (with video clips directed by Marco Pavone)
 2012 – Grande mistero

References

External links

1983 births
Living people
Italian pop singers
Italian women singer-songwriters
Italian singer-songwriters
English-language singers from Italy
Musicians from the Province of Lucca
21st-century Italian singers
21st-century Italian women singers